Nicolás Almagro defeated Potito Starace 4–6, 6–2, 6–1 to win the 2007 Open de Tenis Comunidad Valenciana singles event.

Seeds

Draws

Key
Q - Qualifier
WC - Wildcard
LL - Lucky loser
r - Retired

Finals

Section 1

Section 2

External links
 Singles draw
 Singles Qualifying draw

Singles